Edward Lucas (16 June 1848 – 19 April 1916) was an Australian cricketer. He played one first-class match for Tasmania in 1877.

See also
 List of Tasmanian representative cricketers

References

External links
 

1848 births
1916 deaths
Australian cricketers
Tasmania cricketers
Cricketers from Hobart